A reactionless drive is a hypothetical device producing motion without the exhaust of a propellant. A propellantless drive is not necessarily reactionless when it constitutes an open system interacting with external fields; but a reactionless drive is a particular case of a propellantless drive that is a closed system, presumably in contradiction with the law of conservation of momentum. Reactionless drives are often considered similar to a perpetual motion machine. The name comes from Newton's third law, often expressed as: "For every action, there is an equal and opposite reaction."

Many infeasible reactionless drives are a staple of science fiction for space propulsion.

Closed systems
Through the years there have been numerous claims for functional reactionless drive designs using ordinary mechanics (i.e., devices not said to be based on quantum mechanics, relativity or atomic forces or effects). Two of these represent their general classes: the Dean drive is perhaps the best known example of a "linear oscillating mechanism" reactionless drive; the gyroscopic inertial thruster is perhaps the best known example of a "rotating mechanism" reactionless drive. These two also stand out as they both received much publicity from their promoters and the popular press in their day and both were eventually rejected when proven to not produce any reactionless drive forces. The rise and fall of these devices now serves as a cautionary tale for those making and reviewing similar claims.

Dean drive
The Dean drive was a mechanical device concept promoted by inventor Norman L. Dean. Dean claimed that his device was a "reactionless thruster" and that his working models could demonstrate this effect. He held several private demonstrations but never revealed the exact design of the models nor allowed independent analysis of them. Dean's claims of reactionless thrust generation were subsequently shown to be in error and the "thrust" producing the directional motion was likely to be caused by friction between the device and the surface on which the device was resting and would not work in free space.

Gyroscopic Inertial Thruster (GIT)
The Gyroscopic Inertial Thruster is a proposed reactionless drive based on the mechanical principles of a rotating mechanism. The concept involves various methods of leverage applied against the supports of a large gyroscope. The supposed operating principle of a GIT is a mass traveling around a circular trajectory at a variable speed. The high-speed part of the trajectory allegedly generates greater centrifugal force than the low, so that there is a greater thrust in one direction than the other. Scottish inventor Sandy Kidd, a former RAF radar technician, investigated the possibility (without success) in the 1980s. He posited that a gyroscope set at various angles could provide a lifting force, defying gravity. In the 1990s, several people sent suggestions to the Space Exploration Outreach Program (SEOP) at NASA recommending that NASA study a gyroscopic inertial drive, especially the developments attributed to the American inventor Robert Cook and the Canadian inventor Roy Thornson. In the 1990s and 2000s, enthusiasts attempted the building and testing of GIT machines.

Eric Laithwaite, the "Father of Maglev", received a US patent for his own propulsion system, which was claimed to create a linear thrust through gyroscopic and inertial forces. However, after years of theoretical analysis and laboratory testing of actual devices, no rotating (or any other) mechanical device has been found to produce unidirectional reactionless thrust in free space.

Helical engine

David M. Burns, formerly a NASA engineer at the Marshall Space Flight Center in Alabama, theorized a potential spacecraft propulsion drive that could possibly exploit the known mass-altering effects that occur at near the speed of light. He wrote a paper published in 2019 by NASA in which he describes it as "A new concept for in-space propulsion is proposed in which propellant is not ejected from the engine, but instead is captured to create a nearly infinite specific impulse".

Open systems

Movement with thrust
Several kinds of thrust-generating methods are in use or have been proposed that are propellantless, as they do not work like rockets and reaction mass is not carried nor expelled from the device. However they are not reactionless, as they constitute open systems interacting with electromagnetic waves or various kinds of fields.

Most famous propellantless methods are the gravity assist maneuver or gravitational slingshot of a spacecraft accelerating at the expense of the momentum of the planet it orbits, through the gravitational field, or beam-powered propulsion and solar sailing, using the radiation pressure of electromagnetic waves from a distant source like a laser or the sun.

More speculative methods have also been proposed, like the Mach effect, the quantum vacuum plasma thruster or various hypotheses associated with resonant cavity thrusters.

Movement without thrust

Because there is no well-defined "center of mass" in curved spacetime, general relativity allows a stationary object to, in a sense, "change its position" in a counter-intuitive manner, without violating conservation of momentum.
 The Alcubierre drive is a hypothetical method of apparent faster-than-light propulsion for interstellar travel postulated from the theory of general relativity. Although this concept may be allowed by the currently accepted laws of physics, it remains unproven; implementation would require a negative energy density, and possibly a better understanding of quantum gravity. It is not clear how (or whether) this effect could provide a useful means of accelerating an actual space vehicle and no practical designs have been proposed.
 "Swimming in spacetime" is a general relativistic effect, where an extended body can change its position by using cyclic deformations in shape to exploit the curvature of space, such as due to a gravitational field. In weak gravitational fields, like that of Earth, the change in position per deformation cycle would be far too small to detect.

See also
 Beam-powered propulsion
 Bernard Haisch
 Field propulsion
 Harold E. Puthoff
 Inertialess drive
 Perpetual motion
 Spacecraft propulsion
 Stochastic electrodynamics
 RF resonant cavity thruster (EmDrive)

References

External links
 "Breakthroughs" commonly submitted to NASA
 Inertial Propulsion Engine
 Reactionless Propulsion (Not) at MathPages

Spacecraft propulsion
Pseudoscience
Perpetual motion
Hypothetical technology
Propulsion
Discovery and invention controversies
Fringe physics
Pathological science